Aliabad (also Romanized as ‘Alīābād) is a village in Satar Rural District, Kolyai District, Sonqor County, Kermanshah Province, Iran. At the 2006 census, its population was 110, in 24 families.

References 

Populated places in Sonqor County